Tommaso de Stefani (c. 1250 – c. 1310) was an Italian painter of the Renaissance period, active mainly in Naples.

Biography
The details of painters of this period are nebulous and often confusing. In the absence of details, often Tuscan painters of the period with similar names are recruited, perhaps erroneously, by later art historians as active in Naples. For example, this painter at times is confused for Tommaso di Stefano (Giottino). The exact relationships of mentor/teacher and pupil/follower are often nebulous.

Bernardo de Dominici claimed that Charles I of Naples, after he saw the accomplishments of Cimabue in Florence, had recruited this painter to Naples. Once the Duomo of Naples was completed in 1272, Stefani was commissioned to decorate the tribune and major chapels, including the chapel of Minutoli where some frescoes still exist depicting the Passion of Christ. Many of these have undergone major restorations in later centuries including by Filippo Tesauro in the 14th century. A painted crucifix in the church of San Domenico Maggiore was attributed to Stefani. One of his pupils was Filippo Tesauro. Tomasso's brother, Pietro de Stefani was a sculptor and architect in Naples.

References

1250 births
1310 deaths
Trecento painters
13th-century Italian painters
Italian male painters
Gothic painters
Painters from Naples